7Q or 7-Q may refer to:

7Q, IATA code for Air Libya
KG-7Q outboard motor; see Mercury KG-7Q Super 10 Hurricane
7Q, designation for one of the Qumran Caves
7Q5, a small papyrus fragment discovered in Qumran Cave 7
7q, an arm of Chromosome 7 (human)
7Q, the production code for the 1989 Doctor Who serial Ghost Light

See also
Q7 (disambiguation)